Cristiano Rogério Paes (born 30 June 1974) is a Brazilian bobsledder. He competed in the four man event at the 2002 Winter Olympics.

References

External links
 

1974 births
Living people
Brazilian male bobsledders
Olympic bobsledders of Brazil
Bobsledders at the 2002 Winter Olympics
People from Santo André, São Paulo
Sportspeople from São Paulo (state)